Condylostylus furcatus is a species of long-legged fly in the family Dolichopodidae.

References

Further reading

External links

 

Sciapodinae
Insects described in 1915